The World Health Summit is an international conference that has been held in Berlin every October since 2009. It has developed into one of the world's leading global health conferences. It was held for the first time on the occasion of the 300th anniversary of the founding of the Charité. 2,500 experts from around 100 countries from science, business, politics and civil society discussed the most important issues of global health care and made recommendations. The academic backbone of the event is the M8 Alliance of Academic Health Centers, Universities and National Academies. From the very beginning, the World Health Summit has been under the patronage of the German Chancellor and the French President. Since 2019, the Director-General of the World Health Organization (WHO) has also been a patron of the World Health Summit.

History 
The summit began in 2009 on the occasion of the 300th anniversary of the Charité – Universitätsmedizin Berlin. The founders recognized that whilst similar gatherings of leaders were well established in fields such as economic development and technology, a global forum did not exist for medical practice, research and health care systems.

The summit was established under the patronage of the German chancellor, Angela Merkel, and the President of the French Republic, Nicolas Sarkozy. Sarkozy's successor, President Francois Hollande, continued the patronage as did Emmanuel Macron. They were joined in 2013 by José Manuel Barroso, President of the European Commission. Jean-Claude Juncker and Ursula von der Leyen continued this patronage. Since 2019, the World Health Organization's (WHO) Director-General Tedros Adhanom joined as patron.

Four ministries of the government of the Federal Republic of Germany directly support the summit (Health, Foreign Office, Education and Research, Economic Cooperation and Development).

Mission 
According to the World Health Summit's Mission Statement published in The Lancet in 2009, its mission is in keeping with the United Nations Declaration of Human Rights' (1948) acknowledgement of health as a fundamental human right. At present, more than half of the world's population is not receiving proper medical care, therefore the organizers of the World Health Summit see their mission as improving healthcare worldwide and promoting equitable access to medication and prevention. The achievement of this mission is seen as threatened by unsolved and newly emerging problems such as: "the demographic shift to an ageing society; climate change and its health consequences that are already being felt; new types of epidemics, such as obesity, mental ill-health, and violence and injury, in developed and developing countries, it is eradicating the diseases of HIV, TB, and malaria; the rising costs of health care; and the worldwide economic crisis and its serious threats to the health of populations across the globe.

The World Health Summit seeks to actively address these challenges by bringing together stakeholders from research, education, clinical care and many other disciplines to jointly develop strategies to tackle these major health care issues. The outcome of each multi-sectoral Summit is intended to inform and influence decision-makers such as governments and supranational agencies, as recommendations for meeting future health care challenges.

Leadership
The World Health Summit was founded by Professor Dr med Detlev Ganten, a career medical research scientist and Chairman of the Board of the Charité Foundation, who held his role as World Health Summit President from 2009 to 2020. From 2021, Professor Dr Axel Radlach Pries, dean of Charité - Universitätsmedizin Berlin until 2022, is the standing World Health Summit President.

In addition to Professor Dr Pries' role as standing President, each year the co-presidency rotates amongst the members of the M8 Alliance of Academic Health Centers, Universities and National Academies, which together with the European Union and the World Health Organization is a primary contributor to the World Health Summit's themes and programs.

The International Co-President of the World Health Summit 2023 from 15 to 17 October in Berlin is Adnan Hyder from the George Washington University Milken Institute School of Public Health in the United States of America.

Previous co-presidencies have been exercised by:
 Axel Kahn; Université Paris Descartes (now integrated into the M8 Alliance membership of the Sorbonne); 2009
 Stephen K. Smith; Imperial College London; 2010
 Steve Wesselingh; Monash University (Australia); 2011 [Professor Dr Christina Mitchell fulfilled the role of Co-President during the Summit proper in the absence of Professor Wesselingh]
 Michael Klag; Johns Hopkins University (U.S.); 2012
 John Eu Li Wong; National University of Singapore (Singapore); 2013
 José Otávio Costa Auler Jr.; University of São Paulo Medical School (Brazil); 2014
 Shunichi Fukuhara; School of Public Health, Kyoto University; 2015
 Antoine Flahault; University of Geneva (Switzerland); 2016
 Hélène Boisjoly; University of Montreal (Canada); 2017
 Fernando Regateiro, Coimbra University Hospitals; João Gabriel Silva, Coimbra University (Portugal); 2018
 Ali Jafarian, Tehran University of Medical Sciences (Iran); 2019
Charles Ibingira; Makerere University School of Health Sciences (Uganda); 2020-2021
Eugenio Gaudio and Luciano Saso; Sapienza University of Rome (Italy); 2022
Adnan Hyder; The George Washington University Milken Institute School of Public Health (USA); 2023

Profile 
Each year the World Health Summit focuses on different key topics. These are formulated by members of the M8 Alliance and also by the eminent academicians, researchers and clinicians who form the World Health Summit Council.

Previous World Health Summits 
The first World Health Summit under the motto "The Evolution of Medicine" took place October 14–18, 2009; 700 participants worked on concrete recommendations for dealing with pandemic planning, effective prevention strategies and climate change-related diseases.

In 2010, the World Health Summit was held October 10–13, and focused on the continuum of "Translation – Transition – Transformation". In keeping with these topics, solutions facilitating the translation of medical knowledge into interventions that benefit patients across the globe, the new health challenges in a world of constant transition and the transformation of health politics and management to respond to these challenges were addressed.

The third World Health Summit took place October 23–26, 2011 under the motto: "Today's Science – Tomorrow's Agenda".  The former element of this theme recognized that progress in research and technology development is occurring at an unsurpassed rate, while concurrently the challenges have never been greater, with new phenomena such as the health effects of climate change through the distribution of food and water, but also of vector-borne diseases.  The latter reflected that no country has yet discovered an ideal health-service model, and that therefore the links between evidence and policy on all levels (national and international) needed to be strengthened.

The fourth World Health Summit, held from October 20–24, 2012, under the theme: “Research for Health and Sustainable Development" focused on finding novel solutions for non-communicable diseases and conditions of global concern, such as obesity, diabetes, and mental illness.  This recognized that unhealthy lifestyles are a main cause of these new epidemics, and promoted greater awareness of the global economic risks and human suffering related to the epidemiological transition, as well as the urgent need for sustainable solutions enabling healthcare systems to meet the challenge of non-communicable diseases and conditions.

The fifth World Health Summit, held from October 20–22, 2013, was the first Summit without individual theme. Instead, heightened emphasis was put on the four thematic tracks, structuring the program: Research and Innovation; Education and Leadership; Evidence to Policy; Global Health for Development. For the first time, the World Health Summit was held at the Federal Foreign Office in Berlin. 1,200 participants attended the Summit, additional 1,200 followed the official webcast.

The sixth World Health Summit, was held at the Federal Foreign Office in Berlin from October 19–22, 2014. Central topics were "Climate Change and Health", "Universal Health Coverage", "Physical Activity for Health & Healthy Ageing", and the current Ebola crisis. It attracted more than 1,200 registered participants from around 80 countries. Another 2,000 plus visitors from over 90 countries followed the plenary sessions digitally via live-stream on the Summit's website and social media networks.

Again, the seventh World Health Summit was held at the Federal Foreign Office in Berlin from October 11–13, 2015. Central topics were refugee health, antimicrobial resistance, big data, and the effects of climate change on health. It attracted 1,500 registered participants from more than 90 countries. For the first time, the Startup Track offered young entrepreneurs the chance to present their ideas. mPharma from Ghana were elected as winner of this track.

The eighth World Health Summit was held from October 9–11, 2016, at the Federal Foreign Office in Berlin. Central topics included: Migration and Refugee Health; Big Data and Technological Innovation in Healthcare; Infectious Diseases and Lessons Learnt from Ebola to Zika; Women, Empowerment and Health. It attracted more than 1,600 international participants and ended with the publication of the M8 Alliance Declaration. The Startup Track 2016 was won by iFeel Labs from Israel.

The ninth World Health Summit was held from October 15–17 at Kosmos in Berlin-Friedrichshain. It brought together 2,000 participants from around 100 countries. Central topics included: Health Policy in the G7/G20, Vaccine Research and Development, Big Data for Health Governance, Global Health Security, Healthy and Resilient Cities, Creating Global Health Innovations with Africa, and the UN Sustainable Development Goals. The Startup Track 2017 was won by doctHERs from Pakistan.

The tenth World Health Summit from 14 to 16 October 2018 also took place in Kosmos on Karl-Marx-Allee. 2,400 participants from 100 nations listened to presentations by 300 speakers, including Jens Spahn and Elizabeth Blackburn, on a wide range of global health issues. ISS Commander Alexander Gerst greeted those present in a video message during the opening ceremony.

From 27 to 29 October, the World Health Summit 2019 took place in the cosmos with 2,500 participants and 300 speakers from 100 nations. This year's central themes were "Climate Change and Health", "Transforming Human Capital: Investing in Health and Education", "Universal Health Coverage: Expanding Rights and Access", "Health is a Political Choice: The Future of Health Policy in the G7/G20 and other Political Venues", "SDG 3: The Global Action Plan for Healthy Lives and Well-Being for All", "Focus Africa: Building Capacities and Strong Institutions" and "Digital Health: Shaping Society and the Modern Economy".

The World Health Summit 2020 from 25 to 27 October took place fully digital due to the coronavirus pandemic. 6,000 participants and 300 speakers from 100 nations took part in the sessions covering the topics "Pandemic Preparedness in the Age of COVID-19: Global Cooperation not Competition", "Strengthening the Role of the European Union in Global Health", "Climate Change and Health: Risks and Responses", "Partnership for the Goals: United Nations’ 75th Anniversary", "Accelerating the SDG3 Global Action Plan for Health and Well-Being", "Translational Research: Advancing Innovative Treatments", and "Digital Health & AI for Pandemic Preparedness".

From 24 to 26 October, the World Health Summit 2021 took place in Berlin and digitally. Over 6,000 participants and 400 speakers from 120 nations discussed global health topics in 70 sessions on site in Berlin and online.

In 2022, the World Health Summit took place from October 16 to 18 in Berlin and digitally. WHS 2022 was the first World Health Summit together with the World Health Organization (WHO). A joint WHS/WHO team collaborated closely to bring together the many players in the global health arena. In 60 sessions, 400 speakers and 4,000 participants on-site and 60,000 participants online from 140 nations discussed the most pressing global health issues. On the agenda were topics such as "Climate Change and Health", "Pandemic Preparedness", "Food Security", "Digital Transformation", "Sustainable Health Systems", and "The role of Germany, the G7 and G20 in Global Health".

In 2023, the World Health Summit will take place from October 15 to 17 in Berlin and digitally.

World Health Summit Regional Meetings 
Traditionally, the co-presidency institution hosts the annual M8 Alliance planning meeting in its own home city in spring, preceding the event in October of that year. These meetings evolved into the inaugural World Health Summit Regional Meeting – Asia, held in Singapore from April 8–10, 2013. 900 participants attended this event, held under the theme "Health for Sustainable Development in Asia".

The second World Health Summit Regional Meeting – Latin America, was held in São Paulo from April 6–8, 2014, gathering 1,000 participants from 30 countries. Main topics were "Healthy Life Expectancy", "Urban Health / Health in Megacities", "Increased Research Capacity to Incorporate Technologies", "Management of Health Systems to Ensure Universal Coverage", and "Health Education".

The third World Health Summit Regional Meeting was held from April 13–14, 2015, in Kyoto, Japan. It was organized along three tracks: "Challenges in a Rapidly Aging Society"; "Preparedness & Resilience to Disaster"; "Fostering the Next Generation of Global Health Leaders". 600 participants attended this WHS Regional Meeting.

The World Health Summit Geneva Meeting was held from April 19–21, 2016. It was a cooperation of the Geneva Health Forum and the World Health Summit. The motto was “Global Health: Sustainable and Affordable Innovation in Healthcare”.

In 2017, the fifth WHS Regional Meeting was held in Montreal, Canada, under the Theme "Health and Healthcare Delivery in Pluralistic Societies". Central topics were: New Frontiers in Medical Treatment; Health and Healthcare Delivery for Specific Groups; Environmental, Social and Cultural Determinants of Health; and Medical Education for Optimal Healthcare.

The World Health Summit Regional Meeting Portugal, Coimbra took place from 19 to 20 April 2018. Central topics: "Managing Infections Diseases in Developing Countries", "Global Policies for Health Coverage in Low-Income Countries", "Opportunities and Challenges in Translating Innovation to Healthcare" and "Biomedical Education to a Changing World". The World Health Summit Regional Meeting took place on Kish Island, Iran, from April 29–30, 2019, with the motto "United together for global health". More than 700 participants from 47 different countries attended.

The World Health Summit Regional Meeting in Kampala, Uganda, scheduled for 27–28 April 2020, had to be postponed due to the COVID-19 pandemic. In 2021, the World Health Summit Regional Meeting took place from June 27–30 in Kampala, Uganda.

In 2022, the World Health Summit Regional Meeting took place from June 15 to 17 in Rome, Italy and was organized by Sapienza University of Rome.

The World Health Summit Regional Meeting 2023 will take place on April 13 in Washington DC, USA and online. It will be held under the theme 'Bridging the Science to Policy Gap for Global Health' and is organized by the George Washington University Milken Institute School of Public Health, the Consortium of Universities for Global Health (CUGH), and the Association of Academic Health Centers International (AAHCI).

Criticism and engagement 
The World Health Summit has been criticized by Thomas Gebauer, Director of Medico International, as an "elitist club of decision makers", that ignores both the social factor of global health issues and the notion of health as a human right, but rather serves particular interests. Thus, in 2009, this Frankfurt-based organization initiated an alternative conference as a form of protest against the World Health Summit.

Founding President of the World Health Summit, Professor Dr med Detlev Ganten, has consistently displayed a readiness to engage in constructive discussion with critics, inviting participants of the 2009 alternative conference to attend the World Health Summit 2010 and, thus to enter into a dialogue.

Role of the M8 Alliance 
The M8 Alliance of Academic Health Centers, Universities and National Academies is an academic network of institutions of education and research, including national academies where these exist. It was first officially inaugurated in 2009 on occasion of the first World Health Summit. This international network provides the academic foundation to the World Health Summit.

According to the M8 Alliance Profile, the network seeks to improve global health and works with political and economic decision makers and civil society to develop science-based solutions for health challenges worldwide. It was created as a permanent platform for framing future considerations of global medical developments and health challenges.

A key role of the M8 Alliance is to provide an academic foundation to each World Health Summit, with members contributing to topics and program development.

Members of the global M8 Alliance
The M8 Alliance consists of 28 members and affiliated observers spanning every continent. After the second World Health Summit 2010, the University of São Paulo and the National University of Singapore joined the network. The University of Montreal and the Institut de Recherches Cliniques de Montréal followed in 2012. The first African representative to join in 2013 was Makerere University from Uganda. The 17th member became the University of Geneva in 2014, followed in autumn 2015 by the National Taiwan University, Coimbra Health (Portugal) and the Sapienza University of Rome. In 2016 the Tehran University of Medical Sciences was admitted, followed in 2017 by Istanbul University (Turkey) [22]. In 2019, the Karolinska Institute (Sweden), the Milken Institute School of Public Health at George Washington University, Washington, DC (USA) and the Consortium of Universities for Global Health (CUGH) were added. In 2020, the United Nations University International Institute for Global Health and the American University of Beirut, Lebanon joined the M8 Alliance.
 Charité – Universitätsmedizin Berlin, Germany
 Johns Hopkins University (Bloomberg School of Public Health), Baltimore, USA
 Kyoto University (Graduate School of Medicine), Japan
 Imperial College, London, United Kingdom
 London School of Hygiene and Tropical Medicine, United Kingdom
 Makerere University, Kampala, Uganda
 Monash University Melbourne, Australia
 Université de Montréal, Canada
 Institut de Recherches Cliniques de Montréal, Canada
 Sorbonne Paris Cité, France
 University of São Paulo, Brazil
 National University of Singapore (Yong Loo Lin School of Medicine), Singapore
 University of Geneva, Switzerland
 Geneva University Hospitals, Switzerland
 InterAcademy Medical Panel (IAMP)
 Association of Academic Health Centers International (AAHCI)
 Peking Union Medical College and Chinese Academy of Medical Sciences
 Russian Academy of Medical Sciences , Moscow
 Coimbra Health, Portugal
 Sapienza University of Rome, Italy
 National Taiwan University, Taiwan
 Tehran University of Medical Sciences, Iran
 Istanbul University, Turkey
 Consortium of Universities for Global Health (CUGH)
 Karolinska Institute, Sweden
 Milken Institute School of Public Health at George Washington University, Washington, DC, USA
American University of Beirut, Lebanon
United Nations University International Institute for Global Health

The M8 Alliance secretariat is based at the Charité – Universitätsmedizin Berlin at the Mitte campus. English is the operating language of the group and the World Health Summit.

References

External links 
 

Medical conferences
Charité